This is a list of the 24 observers to the European Parliament for the Czech Republic in the 1999 to 2004 session. They were appointed by the Czech Parliament as observers from 1 May 2003 until the accession of the Czech Republic to the EU on 1 May 2004.

List

References

2003
List
Czech Republic